Shashank (born 22 November 1979) is an Indian actor who predominantly appears in Telugu films

Shashank's first film Aithe which won the National Film Award for Best Feature Film in Telugu. His second film was Sye, where he won a Nandi Award for Best Supporting Actor.

Partial filmography
All films are in Telugu, unless otherwise noted.

References

Telugu male actors
1979 births
Living people
Male actors from Andhra Pradesh
Nandi Award winners
Male actors in Telugu cinema
Indian male film actors
Male actors in Kannada cinema
Male actors in Tamil cinema
Male actors in Hindi cinema